No Water, No Moon is the debut album by Bamboo Mañalac following his departure from his former band, Bamboo. Its lead single was "Questions".

Track listing

Personnel
 Bamboo Mañalac - vocals
 Ria Osorio - piano, keyboard, orchestrator
 Kakoy Legaspi - guitars
 Junjun Regalado - drums
 Simon Tan - bass guitar
 Bong Gonzales - guitars

Additional Musicians
Joy Tamayo, Apple - Back Up Vocals
Kids Choir - Isabella, Lucius, Nadia Tamayo, Vaikunta Tamayo, Zoe Tan, Danny Tan, Cai Yambao, Miles Reyes, Rolfe Reyes
Mabuhay Singers - Raye Lucero, Cely Bautista, Peping De Leon
Strings - Claudia Berenguer, DJ Salonga, Ed Pasamba, Tina Pasamba, Michelle Roque, Mitchie Andra, Patrick Feliciano, Ralph Taylan, Rodel Lorenzo, Roxanne Gutierrez, Silke Hipolito, Ranieza Santos
Ikot Ng Mundo Choir - Angela Valdes, Stella Valdes, itas Valdes, Chico Gonzales
Horns - Wowee De Guzman, Robert De Pano, Romy Javier, Benito San Jose, Romy San Jose

Album Credits
All Songs Written By: Bamboo Mañalac
Produced By: Bamboo Mañalac and Pancho Gonzales
Arrangements By: Bamboo Mañalac, Ria Osario, Kakoy Legaspi
Recorded at: Ambient Studios
Engineer: Chaitanya Tamayo
Guitar tracks for Questions, Back at my Feet, Please, In This Life, Morning Rose, The Only Way & In Shadows recorded at Trax Studios by Angee Rozul
Mixed By: Scott Mcdowell at Hyde Street Studios
Mastered By: Brad Blackwood at Euphonic Masters
Label Manager: Ethel Cachapero
Sleeve Design and Layout by: Willie A. Manzon
Photography By: Mark Nicdao
Styling By Millet Argaza

References

https://www.kwentonitoto.com/2013/04/re-releases-of-bamboos-no-water-no-moon.html

2011 debut albums
Bamboo Mañalac albums
PolyEast Records albums